Red Roses, Red Lips, Red Wine is a 1953 West German romantic drama film directed by Paul Martin and starring Gardy Granass, John Van Dreelen, and Rolf von Nauckhoff. It shares its title with a popular song of the same era. It was made at the Tempelhof Studios in West Berlin. The film's sets were designed by the art director Erich Kettelhut.

Cast

References

Bibliography

External links 
 

1953 films
1953 romantic drama films
German romantic drama films
West German films
1950s German-language films
Films directed by Paul Martin
Films shot at Tempelhof Studios
German black-and-white films
1950s German films